Sharon Springer is an American politician who served as the mayor of Burbank, California. Elected in December 2019, she succeeded Emily Gabel-Luddy.

Early life and education 
Springer's father served in the United States Air Force. As a child, the family moved frequently and lived in several countries, including Spain and the Kingdom of Libya.

Springer earned a Bachelor of Science degree in geography from University of South Alabama and a Master of Science degree in city and regional planning from Ohio State University. She later earned a Master Gardener certificate from University of California Cooperative Extension.

Career 
Prior to entering politics, Springer worked as a real estate appraiser. She was also an administrator at EngAGE, an education non-profit.

In April 2017, Springer was elected to the Burbank City Council. In April 2018, she served as the vice mayor of Burbank.

In December 2019, Springer became the mayor of Burbank.

Personal life 
Springer's husband was Lawrence Lee Gardner, Jr. (died 2010). Springer lives in Burbank, California.

References

External links 
 The Mayors of Burbank, California
 Updated: Burbank City Council candidate Sharon Springer talks issues and concerns at mediacitygroove.com
 Burbank City Council
 Sharon Springer on facebook.com
 Sharon Springer at artsforla.org

California city council members
Women city councillors in California
Living people
Mayors of Burbank, California
Women mayors of places in California
University of South Alabama alumni
21st-century American politicians
21st-century American women politicians
Year of birth missing (living people)
Austin E. Knowlton School of Architecture alumni